António Carvalho may refer to:
 António Carvalho (footballer)
 António Carvalho (cyclist)
 Antonio Carvalho, Canadian mixed martial artist
 Antônio de Carvalho, Brazilian sprinter